The Land God Gave to Cain is a 1958 thriller novel by the British writer Hammond Innes. It was released in the United States by the publishers Knopf. After a plane crash in a remote part of Labrador, a British pilot heads out to investigate based on some radio messages his father has overheard.

References

Bibliography
 James Vinson & D. L. Kirkpatrick. Contemporary Novelists. St. James Press, 1986.

1958 British novels
Novels by Hammond Innes
British thriller novels
Novels set in Canada
William Collins, Sons books